Valentino Moisés Fiévet Mennesson (born 14 February 1991), known simply as Valentino, is a French former footballer who played as a forward. Although he was born and lived most of his life in Spain, he did not hold that country's citizenship.

Football career
Born in Huesca, Aragon, Valentino spent the vast majority of his career in amateur football in his native region. His professional input consisted of 15 minutes for SD Huesca in a 3–1 Segunda División home win against Girona FC, on 20 June 2009.

References

External links

1991 births
Living people
People from Huesca
Sportspeople from the Province of Huesca
French footballers
Footballers from Aragon
Association football forwards
Segunda División players
Tercera División players
SD Huesca footballers
Extremadura UD footballers
AD Almudévar players
UD Barbastro players
French expatriate footballers
Expatriate footballers in Spain
French expatriate sportspeople in Spain